Charles M. Salisbury House is a historic home located at Lacona in Oswego County, New York.  It was built in 1907 and is a -story, clapboard residence with a square plan, steeply pitched multi-gabled roof, an asymmetrical facade, and irregular fenestration.  The facade features a large fixed-pane window with stained glass. Also on the property is a contemporary carriage house and a small residence.

It was listed on the National Register of Historic Places in 1988.

References

Houses on the National Register of Historic Places in New York (state)
Houses completed in 1907
Houses in Oswego County, New York
National Register of Historic Places in Oswego County, New York